The 15th Youth in Film Awards ceremony (now known as the Young Artist Awards), presented by the Youth in Film Association, honored outstanding youth performers under the age of 21 in the fields of film, television and theatre for the 1992-1993 season, and took place on February 5, 1994, at the Sportsmen's Lodge in Studio City, California.

Established in 1978 by long-standing Hollywood Foreign Press Association member, Maureen Dragone, the Youth in Film Association was the first organization to establish an awards ceremony specifically set to recognize and award the contributions of performers under the age of 21 in the fields of film, television, theater and music.

Categories
★ Bold indicates the winner in each category.

Best Young Performer in a Motion Picture

Best Youth Actor Leading Role in a Motion Picture: Drama
★  (tie) Edward Furlong - A Home of Our Own (Gramercy Pictures)
★  (tie) Jason James Richter - Free Willy (Warner Bros)
Jesse Bradford - King of the Hill (Universal Pictures)
Andrew Knott - The Secret Garden (Warner Bros)
Austin O'Brien - Last Action Hero (Columbia Pictures)
Ernie Reyes, Jr. - Surf Ninjas (New Line Cinema)
Heydon Prowse - The Secret Garden (Warner Bros)
Robert J. Steinmiller Jr. - Jack the Bear (20th Century Fox)

Best Youth Actress Leading Role in a Motion Picture: Drama
★ Ariana Richards - Jurassic Park (Universal Pictures)
Clarissa Lassig - A Home of Our Own (Gramercy Pictures)
Kate Maberly - The Secret Garden (Warner Bros)
Remy Ryan - RoboCop 3 (Orion Pictures)
Alicia Silverstone - The Crush (Warner Bros)

Best Youth Actor Leading Role in a Motion Picture: Comedy
★ Mason Gamble - Dennis the Menace (Warner Bros)
David Krumholtz - Life with Mikey (Touchstone Pictures)
Omri Katz - Hocus Pocus (Walt Disney Pictures)
Sean Murray - Hocus Pocus (Walt Disney Pictures)
David Netter - One Good Cop (Hollywood Pictures)
Michael Oliver - Problem Child 2 (Universal Pictures)

Best Youth Actress Leading Role in a Motion Picture: Comedy
★  (tie) Thora Birch - Hocus Pocus (Walt Disney Pictures)
★  (tie) Christina Vidal - Life with Mikey (Touchstone Pictures)
Amy Sakasitz - Dennis the Menace (Warner Bros)
Vinessa Shaw - Hocus Pocus (Walt Disney Pictures)
Madeline Zima - Mr. Nanny (New Line Cinema)
Senta Moses - Home Alone 2: Lost in New York (20th Century Fox)

Best Youth Actor Co-Starring in a Motion Picture: Drama
★ Joseph Mazzello - Jurassic Park (Universal Pictures)
Francis Capra - A Bronx Tale (Savoy Pictures)
Jeremy London - Dazed and Confused (Gramercy Pictures)
Tzvi Ratner Stauber - Family Prayers (Earthquake Productions)
Nick Stahl - The Man Without a Face (Warner Bros)

Best Youth Actress Co-Starring in a Motion Picture: Drama
★ Reese Witherspoon - Jack the Bear (20th Century Fox)
Amber Benson - King of the Hill (Universal Pictures)
Gaby Hoffmann - The Man Without a Face (Warner Bros)
Rae'Ven Kelly - What's Love Got to Do with It (Touchstone)
Irene Ng - The Joy Luck Club (Hollywood Pictures)

Best Youth Actor Under 10 in a Motion Picture
★ Ross Malinger - Sleepless in Seattle (TriStar)
Cameron Boyd - King of the Hill (Universal Pictures)
David Gallagher - Look Who's Talking Now (TriStar)
Norman D. Golden II - Cop and a Half (Universal Pictures)
Eric Lloyd - Heart and Souls (Universal Pictures)
Max Pomeranc - Searching for Bobby Fischer (Paramount)

Best Youth Actress Under 10 in a Motion Picture
★ Melanie Chang - The Joy Luck Club (Hollywood Pictures)
Tabitha Lupien - Look Who's Talking Now (TriStar)
Vu Mai - The Joy Luck Club (Hollywood Pictures)
Julianne Michelle - Family Prayers (Earthquake Productions)
Ivyann Schwan - Problem Child 2 (Universal Pictures)
Shannon Hughes - Honey, I Blew Up the Kid (Walt Disney Pictures)

Best Young Performer in a TV Movie, Mini-Series or Special

Best Youth Actor in a TV Mini-Series, Movie of the Week, or Special
★ Benjamin Brazier - Heidi (Disney)
Derek Baxter - The Man From Left Field (CBS)
Adam Cronan - The Man From Left Field (CBS)
Jonathan Hernandez - They've Taken Our Children: The Chowchilla Kidnapping (ABC)
Miko Hughes - Big Boys Don't Cry (CBS)
David Lascher - The Flood: Who Will Save Our Children (NBC)
Mario Lopez - Big Boys Don't Cry (CBS)
Cory Miller - Commander Toad in Space (ABC)
Eric Pospisil - Other Women's Children (Lifetime)
Shawn Toovey - The Fire Next Time (CBS)

Best Youth Actress in a TV Mini-Series, Movie of the Week, or Special
★ Mary-Kate and Ashley Olsen - Double, Double, Toil and Trouble (ABC)
Nancy Moore Atchison - They (Showtime)
Melissa Clayton - A Child Lost Forever: The Jerry Sherwood Story (NBC)
Molly Orr - A Message From Holly (CBS)
Lexi Randall - Heidi (Disney)
Brooke Stanley - Big Boys Don't Cry (CBS)
Noley Thornton - Heidi (Disney)
Sabrina Wiener - Miracle on Interstate 880 (NBC)

Best Young Performer in a Television Series

Best Youth Actor Leading Role in a Television Series
★ Jonathan Brandis - seaQuest DSV (NBC)
Justin Burnette - Hearts Afire (CBS)
Jeremy Jackson - Baywatch (Syndicated)
Scott McAfee - Home Free (ABC)
Jason Marsden - Almost Home (NBC)
Sean Murray - Harts of the West (CBS)
Ben Savage - Boy Meets World (ABC)
Josiah Trager - Big Brother Jake (Family Channel)
Daniel Steven Gonzalez - Land of the Lost (ABC)

Best Youth Actress Leading Role in a Television Series
★ Rae'Ven Kelly - I'll Fly Away (NBC)
Nicole Eggert - Baywatch (Syndicated)
Erika Flores -  Dr. Quinn, Medicine Woman (CBS)
Angela Goethals -  Phenom (ABC)
Meghann Haldeman - Harts of the West (CBS)
Anndi McAfee - Home Free (ABC)
Ashleigh Blair Sterling - Getting By (ABC)
Nicholle Tom - The Nanny (CBS)
Catherine Wu - Big Brother Jake (Family Channel)
Melissa Joan Hart - Clarissa Explains It All (Nickelodeon)

Best Youth Comedian
★ Johnny Galecki - Roseanne (ABC)
Zachary Bostrom - Harry and the Hendersons (Syndicated)
Doug E. Doug - Where I Live (ABC)
Raushan Hammond - America's Funniest People (ABC)
Isaac Lidsky - Saved by the Bell: The New Class (NBC)
Rider Strong - Boy Meets World (ABC)

Best Youth Comedienne
★ Jenna von Oÿ - Blossom (NBC)
Tatyana M. Ali - The Fresh Prince of Bel-Air (NBC)
Olivia Burnette - Almost Home (NBC)
Staci Keanan - Step by Step (ABC)
Ashlee Levitch - Family Album (CBS)
Raven-Symoné - Hangin' With Mr. Cooper (ABC)

Best Youth Actor Recurring or Regular in a TV Series
★ Adam Wylie - Picket Fences (CBS)
Kenny Blank - Tall Hopes (CBS)
Jeffrey Bomberger - Daddy Dearest (FOX)
Ryan Frances - Sisters (NBC)
Omar Gooding - Hangin' with Mr. Cooper (ABC)

Best Youth Actress Recurring or Regular in a TV Series
★ Sabrina Wiener - Cheers (NBC)
Lacey Bevis - Running the Halls (NBC)
Kimberly Cullum - Against the Grain (NBC)
Yunoka Doyle - Where I Live (ABC)
Lexi Randall - Designing Women (CBS)

Best Youth Actor in a Soap Opera
★ Tommy Michaels - All My Children (ABC)
John Alden - The Young and the Restless (CBS)
Bryan Buffinton - Guiding Light (CBS)
Gregory Burke - Guiding Light (CBS)
Glenn Harris - General Hospital (ABC)
Chris McKenna - One Life to Live (ABC)
Erik von Detten - Days of Our Lives (NBC)
Paul Walker - The Young and the Restless (CBS)

Best Youth Actress in a Soap Opera
★ Rachel Miner - Guiding Light (CBS)
Sarah Michelle Gellar - All My Children (ABC)
Melissa J. Hayden - Guiding Light (CBS)
Lindsay Price - All My Children (ABC)
Alison Sweeney - Days of Our Lives (NBC)
Heather Tom - The Young and the Restless (CBS)
Erin Torpey - One Life to Live (ABC)

Best Youth Actor Guest-Starring in a Television Show
★ Adam Wylie - The Adventures of Brisco County, Jr. (FOX)
J.D. Daniels - Full House (ABC)
Karl David-Dierf - Picket Fences (CBS)
Raushan Hammond - Tales from the Crypt (HBO)
Danny Hart - Key West (FOX)

Best Youth Actress Guest-Starring in a Television Show
★ Courtney Peldon - Lois & Clark: The New Adventures of Superman (ABC)
Vanessa Lee Evigan - Jack's Place (ABC)
Anndi McAfee - Baywatch (Syndicated)
Nicole Rodgers - America's Most Wanted (FOX)
Sabrina Wiener - Beverly Hills, 90210 (FOX)

Best Youth Actor Under 10 in a Television Series or Show
★  (tie) Jonathan Hernandez - General Hospital (ABC)
★  (tie) Shawn Toovey - Dr. Quinn, Medicine Woman (CBS)
Eric Davies - The Sinbad Show (FOX)
Sam Gifaldi - The Mommies (NBC)
Scott Graff - Days of Our Lives (NBC)
Courtland Mead - The Young and the Restless (CBS)
Jacob Parker - Evening Shade (CBS)
Shane Sweet - Married... with Children (FOX)
Nathan Watt - Harts of the West (CBS)

Best Youth Actress Under 10 in a Television Series or Show
★  (tie) Ashley Johnson - Phenom (ABC)
★  (tie) Ashley Peldon - Shameful Secrets (ABC)
Karla Green - Tall Hopes (CBS)
Lily Nicksay - Boy Meets World (ABC)
Kyla Pratt - A Matter of Justice (NBC)
Heather Ramsay - Unsolved Mysteries (NBC)
Alexa Vega - Evening Shade (CBS)
Davida Williams - Hangin' With Mr. Cooper (ABC)

Best Young Performer in a Voice Over Role

Best Youth Actor in a Voice-Over Role: TV or Movie
★ Adam Wylie - All-New Dennis the Menace (CBS)
Chris Allport - Recycle Rex (Disney Channel)
Jason Marsden - Hocus Pocus (Walt Disney Pictures)
Scott McAfee - Batman: The Animated Series (FOX)
Joshua Wiener - Back to the Future: The Animated Series (CBS)

Best Youth Actress in a Voice-Over Role: TV or Movie
★ Anndi McAfee - Tom and Jerry: The Movie (Miramax)
Megan Pryor - Recycle Rex (Disney Channel)
Francesca Smith - Itsy Bitsy Spider (USA Network)

Best Young Host in a Television Show

Outstanding Youth Host in a TV Magazine, News, or Variety Show
★ Mario Lopez - Name Your Adventure (NBC)
Savion Glover - Sesame Street (PBS)
Gary Goldstein - Real News For Kids
Jenn Harris - Real News For Kids

Best Young Ensemble Performance

Outstanding Youth Ensemble in a Television Series
★ Home Improvement (ABC) - Zachery Ty Bryan, Taran Noah Smith, and Jonathan Taylor Thomas Thea (ABC) - Brenden Jefferson, Adam Jeffries, Brandy Norwood, and Jason Weaver
Step by Step (ABC) - Josh Byrne, Christopher Castile, Staci Keanan, Christine Lakin, and Angela Watson
The Mommies (NBC) - Sam Gifaldi, Ryan Merriman, Ashley Peldon, Shiloh Strong, and Joey Zimmerman
Picket Fences (CBS) - Holly Marie Combs Justin Shenkarow, and Adam Wylie
The Nanny (CBS) - Benjamin Salisbury Nicholle Tom, and Madeline Zima

Outstanding Youth Ensemble in a Cable or Off-Prime Time Series
★ Kids Incorporated (Disney Channel) - Eric Balfour Nicole Brown, Jared Delgin, Kenny Ford, Love Hewitt, Anastasia Horne, and Haylie JohnsonRoundhouse (Nickelodeon) - Jennifer Cahi, Alfred Carr Jr., John Crane, Mark David, Shawn Daywalt, Ivan Dudynsky, Micki Duran, Amy Ehrlich, Seymour Willis Green Jr., Natalie Nucci, Julene Renee, and David Sidoni
California Dreams (NBC) - Michael Cade Jay Anthony Franke, Brent Gore, William James Jones, Kelly Packard, and Ryan O'Neill
Saved by the Bell: The New Class (NBC) - Jonathan Angel, Natalia Cigliuti, Isaac Lidsky, Bonnie Russavage, and Robert Sutherland Telfer

Outstanding Youth Ensemble in a Motion Picture
★ The Sandlot (20th Century Fox) - Brandon Quintin Adams, Victor DiMattia, Grant Gelt, Tom Guiry, Chauncey Leopardi, Shane Obedzinski, Patrick Renna, Mike Vitar, and Marty YorkA Home of Our Own (Gramercy Pictures) - Miles Feulner, Edward Furlong, Clarissa Lassig, Amy Sakasitz, and Sarah Schaub
Swing Kids (Hollywood Pictures) - Christian Bale, Robert Sean Leonard, David Tom, and Frank Whaley

Best Young Performer in Live Theatre

Best Youth Actor in Live Theatre
★ J. D. Daniels - Conversations with My Father (Los Angeles)Grant Gelt - Lost in Yonkers (Chicago)
Timothy Hibbard - Just So Stories
Jonathan Charles Kaplan - Falsettos
Jimmy Madio - The Godson
Joshua Miller - Orestes
Joshua Wiener - Lost in Yonkers (Los Angeles)

Best Youth Actress in Live Theatre
★ Soleil Moon Frye - Orestes
Jessica Anthony - Just So Stories
Lindsey Haun - Snoopy
Anastasia Horne - Children in the Street

Best Family Entertainment

Outstanding Youth Mini-Video Series
★ Karate for Kids (Bright Ideas Productions) - Brandon Gaines, Erika Nenekervis, Terri Tseng, Niven Shan, and Joshua Walker Secret Adventures (ep. #1 "Spin") (Taweel-Loos & Co.) - Marcus Andrews, Tamara Daniels, Frankie Ingrassia, Heidi Lucas, Sarah Martineck, Michael MacLeod, Marne Patterson, and Chris Wilson
The Girl's Club (Phillips POV) - Heidi Lucas
The New Adventures of McGee and Me (ep. #10 "In the Nick of Time") (Taweel-Loos & Co.) - Joe Dammann, Sarah Dammann, Chelsea Hertford, Whitby Hertford, and Shaylisa Hurte

Outstanding Family TV Special, Movie of the Week, or Mini-Series
★ Heidi (Disney Channel)A Matter of Justice (NBC)
A Message From Holly (CBS)
Miracle on Interstate 880 (NBC)
They (Showtime)
The Bulkin Trail (Family Channel)

Best New Television Series
★ Dr. Quinn, Medicine Woman (CBS)Boy Meets World (ABC)
Hangin' With Mr. Cooper (ABC)
Phenom (ABC)
Saved by the Bell: The College Years (NBC)
The Nanny (CBS)

Outstanding Family Motion Picture: Action/Adventure
★ Jurassic Park (Universal Pictures)The Nightmare Before Christmas (Buena Vista)
Rudy (TriStar)

Outstanding Family Motion Picture: Comedy
★ Sleepless in Seattle (TriStar)Cool Runnings (Buena Vista)
Life with Mikey (Touchstone)
Look Who's Talking Now (TriStar)
Robin Hood: Men in Tights (20th Century Fox)

Outstanding Family Motion Picture: Drama
★ Free Willy (Warner Bros)A Home of Our Own (Gramercy Pictures)
King of the Hill (Universal Pictures)
The Man Without a Face (Warner Bros)
Searching for Bobby Fischer (Paramount)
The Secret Garden (Warner Bros)

Youth In Film's Special Awards

The Jackie Coogan Award

Outstanding Contribution to Youth Through Motion Pictures
★ Steven SpielbergThe Michael Landon Award

Outstanding Contribution to Youth Through Television
★ Merv Griffin - Jeopardy! and Wheel of Fortune

Former Child Star - Life Achievement Award
★ Shelley Fabares - The Donna Reed Show
★ Jimmy Hawkins - It's A Wonderful Life

Most Promising New Youth Actress
★ Christina Vidal - Life with Mikey

The Music Award of Merit
★ Gail Purse - Producer for Disney's Young Musicians Symphony Orchestra

Family Classic Award
★ Al Burton - Producer of The New Lassie Series

Outstanding Dissemination of News for Kids Through Radio
★ Radio AAHS Program - Bill Barnett, President

Outstanding Youth Actors in a Family Foreign Film
★ Ruaidhri Conroy and Ciarán Fitzgerald (Ireland) - Into the West

Outstanding Family Foreign Film
★ Into the West (Ireland) - Directed by Mike Newell

References

External links
Official site

Young Artist Awards ceremonies
1993 film awards
1993 television awards
1994 in California
1994 in American cinema
1994 in American television